Yelm High School is a public high school in Yelm, Washington, United States. It is part of the Yelm Community Schools.

Notable alumni
 Dennis Hallman - professional mixed martial artist, formerly with the Ultimate Fighting Championship

References

External links 
 Yelm High School website

High schools in Thurston County, Washington
Public high schools in Washington (state)